Bredin is a surname. Notable people with the surname include:
Andrew Bredin (born 1982), Leitrim's last living Otter breeder
Andrew Bredin (born 1962), former English cricketer
Bala Bredin (1916–2005), British Army officer
Correne Bredin (born 1980), member of the Canadian National ice hockey team
Edgar Craven Bredin (born 1886), Irish mechanical and locomotive engineer, later a railway manager
Frédérique Bredin (born 1956), French politician
Gary Bredin (born 1948), retired Canadian professional ice hockey forward
Jane Bredin (1959–2011), international equestrian
Jean-Denis Bredin (17 May 1929, Paris) is a French attorney, founding partner of Bredin Prat
Patricia Bredin (born 1934), British actress, the first UK entry in the Eurovision Song Contest
Roger Bredin (born 1953), Swedish curler
William Bredin (1862–1942), Canadian politician and pioneer

See also
Bredin, Alberta, municipal district in northwestern Alberta, Canada
Breddin
St Mary Bredin church in Canterbury, England